This is a list of notable people who were born or have lived in Volgograd (1589–1925: Tsaritsyn, 1925–1961: Stalingrad), Russia.

Born in Volgograd

19th century

1801–1900 
 Heinrich Wullschlägel (1805–1864), Russia-born Dutch-German bishop, botanist and translator
 Pyotr Anokhin (1898–1974), Russian biologist and physiologist

20th century

1901–1920 
 Elena Miramova (1901–1992), Russian-born actress and playwright
 Pavel Serebryakov (1909–1977), Russian pianist
 Vasili Yermasov (1913–1990), Soviet football goalkeeper and manager
 Vasily Yefremov (1915–1990), aviation commander of the Soviet Army and ace during the Great Patriotic War, Hero of the Soviet Union
 Emma Treyvas (1918–1982), Soviet Jewish stage and film actress

1921–1940 
 Vladimir Kryuchkov (1924–2007), Soviet lawyer, diplomat and head of the KGB
 Sasha Filippov (1925–1942), spy for the Red Army during the Battle of Stalingrad
 Gennadi Kryuchkov (1926–2007), Russian leader of the Baptist church in the Soviet Union
 Benjamin P. Yudin (1928–1983), Kazakhstan scholar of oriental studies, historian, philologist
 Boris Maluev (1929–1990), Soviet Russian painter
 Aleksandra Pakhmutova (born 1929), Soviet and Russian composer
 Oleg Trubachyov (1930–2002), Russian doctor in philology
 Elem Klimov (1933–2003), Soviet Russian film director
 Volodymyr Nemoshkalenko (1933–2002), Soviet Ukrainian physicist
 Vladimir Pasechnik (1937–2001), Soviet biologist and bioweaponeer

1941–1960 
 Alevtina Aparina (1941–2013), Russian politician
 Ivan Karetnikov (born 1942), Soviet swimmer
 Valeriya Zaklunnaya (born 1942), Soviet and Russian actress
 Evgeny Kochergin (born 1945), Soviet and Russian speaker and presenter
 Vladimir Arzamaskov (1951–1985), Soviet Russian basketball player
 Yuri Saukh (born 1951), Soviet football player and a current Russian coach
 Vladimir Faizulin (born 1952), Russian professional football coach and a former player
 Tatyana Vedeneyeva (born 1953), Soviet and Russian actress and an anchor lady for the Soviet children program Good Night, Little Ones!
 Vera Sotnikova (born 1960), Soviet and Russian theater and film actress, TV presenter

1961–1970 
 Aleksandr Nikitin (born 1961), Russian professional football coach and a former player
 Vasiliy Sidorenko (born 1961), Soviet and Russian hammer thrower
 Anatoliy Volkov (born 1961), Soviet sprint canoer
 Sergei Popkov (born 1963), Russian professional football coach and a former player
 Igor Vasilyev (born 1964), Russian handball player
 Elena Agafonnikova (born 1965), Soviet and Russian female professional basketball player
 Vadim Baykov (born 1965), Soviet and Russian composer, singer, songwriter and producer
 Oleg Mavromati (born 1965), Russian artist-actionist and a filmmaker
 Aleksey Zhukov (born 1965), Russian professional football coach and a player
 Irina Apeksimova (born 1966), Russian stage and screen actress
 Mikhail Belov (born 1966), Russian professional football coach and a former player
 Kamil Larin (born 1966), Russian actor
 Marina Abroskina (1967–2011), Russian female professional basketball player
 Lev Ivanov (born 1967), Russian professional football coach
 Vladimir Karabutov (born 1967), Russian water polo player
 Aleksandr Tsarenko (born 1967), Russian professional footballer
 Oleg Grebnev (born 1968), Russian team handball player
 Yuriy Kalitvintsev (born 1968), footballer
 Oleg Sergeyev (born 1968), Russian football player
 Eduard Malyi (born 1969), Russian football player and referee
 Valeriy Belousov (born 1970), Russian decathlete
 Valeri Burlachenko (born 1970), Russian professional football coach and a former player
 Vladimir Ovchinnikov (born 1970), Russian javelin thrower
 Svetlana Pryakhina (born 1970), Russian handball player
 Yuliya Sotnikova (born 1970), Russian world indoor champion and Olympic bronze medallist in the 4 x 400 metres relay

1971–1975 
 Svetlana Pankratova (born 1971), has, according to Guinness World Records, the longest legs of any woman in the world
 Leonid Slutsky (born 1971), Russian professional football coach and a former player
 Vitaly Suetov (born 1971), former Russian professional footballer
 Lioubov Vassilieva (born 1971), Russian paralympic athlete
 Aleksei Babenko (born 1972), Russian professional footballer
 Igor Kshinin (born 1972), Russian male boxer
 Aleksandr Troynin (born 1972), Russian professional footballer
 Yuri Aksenov (born 1973), Kazakhstani professional footballer
 Tatyana Gordeyeva (born 1973), Russian heptathlete
 Vyacheslav Malakeev (born 1973), Russian professional football coach and a former player
 Denys Tourtchenkov (born 1973), Russian sprint canoer
 Alexander Chekurov (born 1974), Russian Paralympic swimmer
 Alexandr Gaidukov (born 1974), water polo player of Russia and Kazakhstan
 Sergei Orlov (born 1974), Russian football coach and a former player
 Denis Pankratov (born 1974), Russian butterfly swimmer
 Aleksey Petrov (born 1974), Russian weightlifter
 Sergey Pogorelov (born 1974), Russian team handball player and Olympic champion
 Marina Akobiya (born 1975), Russian water polo player, who won the bronze medal at the 2000 Summer Olympics
 Roman Babichev (born 1975), Russian professional footballer
 Aleksandr Berketov (born 1975), Russian professional football coach and a former player
 Roman Grebennikov (born 1975), Russian political figure and former Mayor of Volgograd

1976–1980 
 Ilya Borodin (born 1976), Russian professional footballer
 Yuliya Ivanova (born 1977), Russian rhythmic gymnast
 Yelena Krivoshey (born 1977), Russian rhythmic gymnast
 Maxim Marinin (born 1977), Russian pair skater
 Roman Ivanovsky (born 1977), Russian breaststroke swimmer
 Olga Shtyrenko (born 1977), Russian rhythmic gymnast
 Vladimir Smirnov (born 1977), Russian professional footballer
 Zakhar Dubensky (born 1978), Russian football midfielder
 Alexey Kravtsov (born 1978), Russian jurist
 Albina Dzhanabaeva (born 1979), Russian singer, actress, TV-Host and from 2004 to 2013 member in the girl group VIA Gra
 Yuri Kudinov (born 1979), Russian long-distance swimmer
 Mikhail Mysin (born 1979), Russian professional footballer
 Maksim Opalev (born 1979), Russian sprint canoeist
 Dmitri Parmuzin (born 1979), Russian football coach and a former player
 Denis Pchelintsev (born 1979), Russian professional football player
 Natalya Shipilova (born 1979), Russian team handball player
 Vitaliy Shkurlatov (born 1979), Russian long jumper
 Anna Efimenko (born 1980), Russian Paralympic swimmer
 Pavel Mogilevskiy (born 1980), Russian professional footballer
 Olga Pikhienko (born 1980), Russian circus performer
 Sergei Rashevsky (born 1980), Russian footballer
 Igor Vlasov (born 1980), Russian music producer
 Yakiv Zalevskyi (born 1980), Russian-Ukrainian professional footballer

1981–1985 
 Maksim Bondarenko (born 1981), Russian professional footballer
 Raman Kirenkin (born 1981), Belarusian international footballer
 Marina Lapina (born 1981), Russian-born Azerbaijani hammer thrower
 Yelena Maglevannaya (born 1981), Russian free-lance journalist
 Andrei Rekechinski (born 1981), Russian water polo player
 Andrei Serbin (born 1981), Russian professional footballer
 Yekaterina Tochenaya (born 1981), Russian-Kyrgyz swimmer
 Andrei Bochkov (born 1982), Russian footballer
 Anna Chapman (born 1982), Russian entrepreneur, television host and agent of the Russian Federation
 Aleksandr Gorbatikov (born 1982), Russian handball player
 Yelena Isinbayeva (born 1982), Russian pole vaulter, two-time Olympic gold medalist (2004 and 2008) and three-time World Champion (2005, 2007 and 2013)
 Maya Petrova (born 1982), Russian handball player
 Anton Sakharov (born 1982), Russian footballer (defender)
 Yelena Slesarenko (born 1982), Russian high jumper
 Sergei Strukov (born 1982), Russian football forward
 Mikhail Chalykh (born 1983), Russian professional heavyweight kickboxer
 Vladimir Chekunov (born 1983), Russian professional football player
 Sergei Mikhailov (born 1983), Russian professional footballer
 Dmitri Timachev (born 1983), Russian professional footballer
 Aleksei Yepifanov (born 1983), Russian professional footballer
 Igor Berezutskiy (born 1984), Russian swimmer
 Valeri Korobkin (born 1984), Kazakhstani professional football player of Russian descent
 Lev Leviev (born 1984), Internet entrepreneur and investor
 Yuliana Salakhova (born 1984), Russian sprint canoer
 Anna Sedoykina (born 1984), Russian handball player
 Olga Bakaldina (born 1985), Russian swimmer
 Olga Levina (born 1985), Russian handball player
 Olga Kucherenko (born 1985), Russian long jumper
 Alexandr Tarabrin (born 1985), Russian-Kazakhstani swimmer

1986–1990 
 Aleksandr Katsalapov (born 1986), Russian footballer
 Yulia MacLean (born 1986), Russian-born New Zealand classical crossover singer
 Pavel Atman (born 1987), Russian handball player
 Aleksei Bondarev (born 1987), Russian footballer
 Denis Dorozhkin (born 1987), Russian professional football player
 Aleksei Druzin (born 1987), Russian professional football player
 Mikhail Kukushkin (born 1987), professional Kazakhstani tennis player of Russian origin
 Alexey Molchanov (born 1987), Russian champion freediver, five time world vice-champion and world record holder in freediving
 Artyom Varakin (born 1987), Russian footballer
 Maksim Volkov (born 1987), Russian professional football player
 Denis Biryukov (born 1988), Russian male volleyball player
 Maria Bulakhova (born 1988), Russian swimmer
 Larisa Ilchenko (born 1988), Russian long-distance swimmer. She has won eight world titles and a gold at the 2008 Olympics.
 Sergey Perunin (born 1988), Russian swimmer
 Maria Savenkov (born 1988), Israeli Olympic rhythmic gymnast
 Yulia Koltunova (born 1989), Russian diver
 Marina Sudakova (born 1989), Russian team handball player
 Valentina Golubenko (born 1990), chess Woman Grandmaster and World U-18 girls champion of 2008
 Tatyana Khmyrova (born 1990), Russian handballer
 Ekaterina Lyubushkina (born 1990), Russian volleyball player

1991–2000 
 Oleg Li (born 1991), Russian professional ice hockey winger
 Philipp Davydenko (born 1992), Russian tennis player
 Natalia Malykh (born 1993), Russian volleyball player
 Vladimir Zubarev (born 1993), Russian football player
Egor Koulechov (born 1994), Israeli-Russian basketball player for Israeli team Ironi Nahariya
 Polina Vedekhina (born 1994), Russian handballer
 Anna Vyakhireva (born 1995), Russian female handballer
 Anastasia Sidorova (1996), Russian artistic gymnast
 Natalia Vikhlyantseva (born 1997), Russian tennis player
 Evgeny Koptelov (born 1998), Russian swimmer

Lived in Volgograd 
 Kurt Adler (1907–1977), Austrian classical chorus master, music conductor, author and pianist. Founder, musical director, and first conductor of the Symphonic Orchestra Stalingrad (1935–1937).
 Vasily Zaytsev (1915–1991), Soviet sniper and Hero of the Soviet Union during World War II. Between 10 November and 17 December 1942, during the Battle of Stalingrad, he killed 225 soldiers and officers of the Wehrmacht and other Axis armies, including 11 enemy snipers.
 Larisa Gorchakova (born 1964), Russian backstroke swimmer, who won a bronze medal at the 1982 World Aquatics Championships
 Oleg Veretennikov (born 1970), professional association football coach and a former international footballer
 Yevgeny Sadovyi (born 1973), Russian freestyle swimmer
 Nikolay Davydenko (born 1981), Russian former professional tennis player.
 Evgeni Plushenko (born 1982), Russian figure skater, four-time Olympic medalist, three-time World champion, seven-time European champion, four-time Grand Prix Final champion and a ten-time Russian national champion. Plushenko lived in Volgograd before moving to Saint Petersburg in 1994.
 Viktor Borisov (born 1985), Russian professional footballer

See also 

 List of Russian people
 List of Russian-language poets

References

External links 
 Самые известные люди Волгограда 
 Знаменитости Волгограда 
 Какие известные люди родились в Волгограде 
 Знай наших 
 Место рождения: Волгоград 
 Волгоград: Известные люди города 

Volgograd
Volgograd
List